The House of Sisowath (UNGEGN: ,) is one of the two royal houses of Cambodia, alongside its counterpart, the House of Norodom. Both it and its sister house have a claim to the throne as descendants of King Ang Duong. Its members are the descendants of King Sisowath who reigned from 1904 to 1927. It was the ruling royal house from 1904 to 1941. It has produced three monarchs of Cambodia, and five prime ministers.

Family tree

Sisowath I (1840–1927)
Sisowath Essaravong (1858–1906)
Sisowath Yubhiphan (1877–1967)
Sisowath Rathary (1878–1946)
Sisowath Phineary
Sisowath Sorikanrattana
Sisowath Sirik Matak (1914–1975)
Sisowath Chariya (born 1940)
Sisowath Charidy (born 1974)
 Sisowath Rattana Tevi (born 2002)
 Sisowath Kethana Devi (born 2007)
Sisowath Sirirath (born 1946)
Sisowath Methavy (1922–1978)
Sisowath Thomico (born 1952)
Sisowath Essaro (1924–2004)
Sisowath Tesso
Sisowath Vitouriya (1927-1978)
Sisowath Thonnika (1929-1975)
Sisowath Virota (1932-1975)
Sisowath Chuttima (1935-1975)
Sisowath Sisura (1879–1927) married Sisowath Darameth
Sisowath Ritharavong (1935–1975)
Sisowath Sararidh
Sisowath Chattivong (1887-1954)
Sisowath Duong Madhura (1863-)
Sisowath Monivong (1875–1941) married Norodom Kanviman Norleak Tevi (1876–1912)
Sisowath Monireth (1909–1975)
Sisowath Monipong (1912–1956)
Sisowath Samyl Monipong (1941)
Sisowath Pongsyria (1942-1975)
Sisowath Lysa (1942-1975)
Sisowath Monisisowath (1943-1975)
Sisowath Moniringsy (1943)
Sisowath Sovethvong (1945-1994)
Sisowath Pongneary (1947)
Sisowath Monisophea (1949-1975)
Sisowath Duong Daravong (1950-1974)
Sisowath Reymoni (1952-1975)
Sisowath Siviman (1953-1975)
Sylvia Sisowath (1954-1975)
Sisowath Ponnirath (1956-1975)
Sisowath Kossamak (1904–1975) married Norodom Suramarit
Norodom Sihanouk
 Sisowath Chamraengvongs (1870–1916) married Sisowath Yubhiphan
Sisowath Youtevong (1913–1947)
 Sisowath Watchayavong (1891–1972)
Sisowath Duong Lakheana 
Sisowath Darameth
 Sisowath Narith (born 1964)
 Richard Sisowath Chhorothavong (born 1988)
 Jessica Darleya Sisowath (born 1992)
 Sisowath Noryvong Nikko (born 1992)
 Sisowath Narita (born 1996)
 Sisowath Chakrey Viraktep (born 1997)

 Sisowath Yeun Vong (1918-2008)

List of Sisowath monarchs

List of Sisowath consorts

List of Sisowath prime ministers

Notes

References 

 
Cambodian monarchy
Asian royal families